David J. Archibald  (born April 14, 1969) is a Canadian professional ice hockey coach and former player. Archibald played for the Minnesota North Stars, New York Rangers, Ottawa Senators, and New York Islanders of the National Hockey League (NHL).

Playing career
After playing four seasons in the Western Hockey League for the Portland Winter Hawks, Archibald was drafted by the Minnesota North Stars in the first round, sixth overall, of the 1987 NHL Entry Draft. He made his NHL debut with the North Stars in the 1987–88 season. In his first two NHL seasons, he scored 27 goals and added 39 assists. Early in the 1989–90 season, the North Stars traded Archibald to the New York Rangers for defenceman Jayson More.

Archibald finished the 1989–90 season with the Rangers' IHL affiliate, the Flint Spirits, before leaving to join the Canadian National Hockey Team for two seasons. This included representing Canada at the 1992 Winter Olympics, where Archibald won a silver medal.

Archibald returned to the NHL in the 1992–93 season with the Ottawa Senators. After four seasons with the Senators, Archibald played in seven games with the New York Islanders in the 1996–97 season. He also played in Germany's Deutsche Eishockey Liga that season with the Frankfurt Lions. He then spent three seasons in the IHL before finishing up his career in Sweden's Elitserien with Linköpings HC in the 1999–2000 season.

In his NHL career, Archibald appeared in 323 games. He scored 57 goals and added 67 assists. He also played in five games for Minnesota during the 1989 Stanley Cup Playoffs, recording one assist.

Coaching career
Archibald joined the Chilliwack Bruins as an assistant coach prior to the 2008-09 season and added the duties of Hockey Operations Advisor and Community Liaison in February 2009.

Career statistics

Regular season and playoffs

International

References

External links

Chilliwack Sports Hall of Fame profile

1969 births
Binghamton Senators players
Canadian ice hockey right wingers
Frankfurt Lions players
Ice hockey people from British Columbia
Ice hockey players at the 1992 Winter Olympics
Linköping HC players
Living people
Minnesota North Stars draft picks
Minnesota North Stars players
National Hockey League first-round draft picks
New York Islanders players
New York Rangers players
Olympic ice hockey players of Canada
Olympic silver medalists for Canada
Ottawa Senators players
People from Chilliwack
Portland Winterhawks players
San Antonio Dragons players
Utah Grizzlies (IHL) players
Olympic medalists in ice hockey
Medalists at the 1992 Winter Olympics
Canadian expatriate ice hockey players in Germany
Canadian expatriate ice hockey players in Sweden
Canadian expatriate ice hockey players in the United States